The El Paso and Southwestern Railroad YMCA, also known as the Douglas YMCA, is a large brick building in Douglas, Arizona.  It was listed on the National Register of Historic Places in 1984.

It is a Mission Revival style
building designed by architect Theodore C. Link. It has a 1918 one-story addition.

References

Clubhouses on the National Register of Historic Places in Arizona
Buildings and structures completed in 1905
Buildings and structures in Cochise County, Arizona
YMCA buildings in the United States
1905 establishments in Arizona Territory
National Register of Historic Places in Cochise County, Arizona
Douglas, Arizona
YMCA